Ilario Castagner (18 December 1940 – 18 February 2023) was an Italian football manager and player, who played as a striker.

Castagner died in Perugia on 18 February 2023, at the age of 82.

References

External links

1940 births
2023 deaths
People from Vittorio Veneto
Sportspeople from the Province of Treviso
Italian footballers
Footballers from Veneto
Association football forwards
Serie B players
Serie C players
A.C. Reggiana 1919 players
A.C. Legnano players
A.C. Perugia Calcio players
A.C. Prato players
Rimini F.C. 1912 players
Italian football managers
Serie A managers
A.C. Perugia Calcio managers
S.S. Lazio managers
A.C. Milan managers
Inter Milan managers
Delfino Pescara 1936 managers
Ascoli Calcio 1898 F.C. managers
pisa S.C. managers